Berkson is a surname. Notable people with the surname include:

Joseph Berkson (1899–1982), American physicist
Berkson's paradox (or Berkson's fallacy)
Berkson error model
Bill Berkson (born 1939), American poet
Bradley M. Berkson (born 1963), American defense official

See also 
Bergson (disambiguation)